= Karen ní Mheallaigh =

Irish classical scholar

Academic background
- Education: Trinity College Dublin; Johns Hopkins University

Academic work
- Discipline: Classics

Karen ní Mheallaigh is Professor of Classics and Director of Graduate Studies at Johns Hopkins University with a research specialism in ancient fiction.

== Education ==
Ní Mheallaigh received her BA in 1997 and a PhD in Classics from Trinity College Dublin in 2005.

== Career ==
Ní Mheallaigh taught at Liverpool (2004–2005), Swansea (2005–2007) and Exeter (2007–2020) before taking up her position at The Johns Hopkins University in 2020. She has also held a fellowship from the Arts and Humanities Research Council of the UK (2011–2012) and a Marie Curie fellowship at the Aarhus Institute of Advanced Studies (AIAS), Denmark (2014–2016), where she worked on the project "Discovering the ancient scientific imagination".

== Selected publications ==
Monographs:

- The Moon in the Greek and Roman imagination: selenography in myth, literature, science and philosophy. Cambridge and New York: Cambridge University Press, 2020.
- Reading fiction with Lucian: fakes, freaks and hyperreality. Cambridge: Cambridge University Press, 2014.

Edited books:

- Cueva, E., G. Schmeling, P. James, K. ní Mheallaigh, S. Panayotakis, N. Scippacercola. 2018. Re-Wiring the Ancient Novel. Volume 2: Roman Novels and other important texts. Ancient Narrative Supplement 24.2. Groningen.
